Arrondissements of Belgium are subdivisions below the provinces of Belgium. There are administrative, judicial and electoral arrondissements. These may or may not relate to identical geographical areas.

Belgium, a federalized state,  geographically consists of three regions, of which only Flanders and Wallonia are subdivided into five provinces each; Brussels is neither a province nor is it part of one.

Administrative

The 43 administrative arrondissements are an administrative level between the municipalities and the provinces. Brussels-Capital forms a single arrondissement for all 19 municipalities in the region by that name.

As an exception, the arrondissement of Verviers has two NUTS codes: BE335 for the French-speaking part and BE336 for the German-speaking part. The latter is identical to the area of the German-speaking community.

Judicial

Belgium has 12 judicial arrondissements:

 The arrondissement Liège covers the French-speaking part of the province of Liège
 The arrondissement Eupen covers the German-speaking part of the province of Liège  
 The arrondissement Brussels covers the Capital Region and the administrative arrondissement of Halle-Vilvoorde (western part of Flemish Brabant province)
 The arrondissement Leuven covers the administrative arrondissement of Leuven (eastern part of Flemish Brabant province)
 The remaining 8 arrondissements are coterminous with, and have the same names as, the remaining 8 provinces

Until March 31, 2014 Belgium had 27 judicial arrondissements. These are now sections of today's 12 judicial arrondissements. In addition, the arrondissement Brussels was divided into the sections Brussels and Halle-Vilvoorde.

Electoral
Until the end of 1999 the electoral districts for the election of the parliaments were electoral arrondissements; since the start of 2000 these are the ten provinces. The arrondissement of Brussels-Capital (geographically coinciding with the Brussels-Capital Region) is not part of any province and consequently forms its own electoral district.

As the only part of Belgium, the Parliament of Wallonia still uses electoral arrondissements. Each electoral arrondissement consists of at least one (administrative) arrondissement. There were previously 13 such electoral districts, but they have since been reduced to 11. Each of these electoral districts take their names from the arrondissements they consist of, usually decreasing in order of population.

See also

 Municipalities in Belgium
 Communities, regions and language areas of Belgium

References
 

 
Subdivisions of Belgium
Arrondissements
Belgium 3
Districts, Belgium
Belgium geography-related lists

de:Verwaltungsgliederung Belgiens#Bezirke